Tribhuwannagar  is a village development committee in Sarlahi District in the Janakpur Zone of south-eastern Nepal. At the time of the 1991 Nepal census it had a population of 2,515 people living in 391 individual households.

It is located on the eastern outskirts of Malangawa.

References

External links
UN map of the municipalities of Sarlahi  District

Populated places in Sarlahi District